Haradok District is a district (raion) in Vitebsk Region, Belarus. Its administrative centre is Haradok.

The largest lakes of the district are Yezyaryscha Lake (the thirteenth largest in Belarus) and Losvida Lake (the eighteenth largest in Belarus).

References

 
Districts of Vitebsk Region